Montopia was a defunct social role-playing game, the first created by Zynga for mobile devices. Players attempt to uncover the truth about Montopia, a lost monster Utopia, while collecting and fusing monsters together to strengthen their abilities. The game was shut down on December 21, 2012.

History
Montopia was originally launched in early 2012 only in Japan, for Apple iOS and Google Android devices. Montopia was released globally in English for iOS and Android in September 2012 and followed with Traditional Chinese and Korean versions in October 2012. The game was closed on December 21, 2012.

Gameplay
Montopia is a mobile social role-playing game that challenges players to travel with their childhood friend, Milly, across the land of Montopia. Montopia is an island Utopia where mankind and monsters once lived before it was destroyed by a mysterious disaster. The goal of Montopia is for players to collect and train monsters and use them in battles to discover the island’s secrets.

Currency
Montopia was free to download on iOS and Android devices. Through in-app purchases, players can buy energy that help them grow stronger and enhance their gameplay.

References

External links
Montopia on Facebook

2012 video games
Social casual games
Video games developed in Japan
IOS games
Zynga
Android (operating system) games